Cuneonavicular ligaments may refer to:

 Dorsal cuneonavicular ligaments
 Plantar cuneonavicular ligaments